Prochora is a genus of spiders in the family Miturgidae. It was first described in 1886 by Simon. , it contains 2 species.

References

Miturgidae
Araneomorphae genera
Spiders of Asia